CNR may stand for:

Arts, entertainment and media
China National Radio, the national radio station of the People's Republic of China
CNR Music, a Dutch record and video/DVD label
"CNR", a song about Charles Nelson Reilly by "Weird Al" Yankovic on the 2009 album Internet Leaks

Businesses and organisations
Canadian National Railway (CN), formerly Canadian National Railways (CNR)
CNR Group, the China Northern Locomotive & Rolling Stock Industry (Group) Corporation
China CNR, a Chinese railway equipment manufacturer
Rausser College of Natural Resources at the University of California, Berkeley
College of New Rochelle, Catholic college based in New Rochelle, New York, U.S.
College of Natural Resources (Bhutan)
Compagnie Nationale du Rhône, a French electricity generating company
Council of National Representatives, governing body of International Council of Nurses
Czech National Council, Česká národní rada (ČNR), former legislative body of the Czech Republic 
National Council of the Resistance, Conseil national de la Résistance, World War II French organisation
National Council of European Resistance (French: Conseil National de la Résistance Européenne), French political organization
National Research Council (Italy), Consiglio Nazionale delle Ricerche, Italian national research council
Romanian National Committee (Romanian: Comitetul Național Român), the name of several organisations

People
Charles Nelson Reilly (1931–2007), American actor, comedian, director 
C. N. R. Rao (born 1934), solid state scientist

Science and technology
CNR (software), formerly software for Linux
Carrier-to-noise ratio, the signal-to-noise ratio of a modulated signal
Chief of Naval Research, in the U.S. Navy
Cisco Network Registrar, software
Communications and networking riser, a PC motherboard slot
Combat-net radio
Contrast-to-noise ratio, a measure used to determine image quality

Other uses
CNR Yenişehir Exhibition Center, Mersin, Turkey
 cnr, ISO 639-3 and ISO 639-2 code for Montenegrin language
 Catholic, nationalist, republican community in Northern Ireland

See also
CNR Bridge (disambiguation)
Cops and Robbers (disambiguation)
List of colleges of natural resources